Arcos de Zapopan is a limestone monument in Zapopan, in the Mexican state of Jalisco.

References

External links

Buildings and structures in Jalisco
Zapopan